Adamke or Adamke Cheema is a village in the Punjab province of Pakistan.  The village is located at 32°23'N 74°21'E  and is nearly 6 km away from Daska.

Geography and climate
Adamke is cold during winters and hot and humid during summers. May and June are the hottest months. Its quite humid during rainy season of July and August. The temperature during winter may drop to 0°C. Most of the rain falls during the Monsoon season in summer which sometimes results in flooding.

References 

Villages in Sialkot District